Oak Hill is a city in Fayette County, West Virginia, United States. The population was 8,179 at the 2020 census. It is part of the Beckley metropolitan area. The city is also home to the historic Oak Hill Railroad Depot which still stands today as an artisan shop. Country singer Hank Williams died in Oak Hill on his way to a concert on January 1, 1953. More recently, recreation has become a leading industry as the city neighbors the New River Gorge National Park and Preserve.

Recreation 
The City is home to several rafting companies, adventure resorts and parks. Just a ten minute drive from The New River Gorge National Park and Preserve Oak Hill has a large portfolio of outdoor and recreational activities. In June, 2022 Governor Jim Justice unveiled a new route on The WV Rides program in which runs through Route 16 in Oak Hill.

Rafting 
 ACE Adventure resort.
 River expeditions.
 Appalachian White water.

Parks 
 Needles eye park.
 Oak Hill City Park.
 Collins Park and Disc Golf course.
 Russel E. Matthews Park at Harlem Heights.
 Doc Hamilton Dog Park.
 The Lively Family Amphitheater.

Geography
Oak Hill is located at  (37.982775, -81.145334).

Climate

History
Oak Hill was settled in 1820. The community was so named on account of an oak tree at the elevated town site. It was incorporated as a town in 1905.
Oak Hill is the supposed place of death of Hank Williams Sr. According to his driver Charles Carr, they had stopped at a gas station in Oak Hill and found Williams dead in the backseat. On March 26, 2016, the city was honored with a historical marker to pay tribute to the memory of Hank Williams.

Demographics

2010 census
As of the census of 2010, there were 7,730 people, 3,398 households, and 2,085 families living in the city. The racial makeup of the city was 93.3% White, 4.3% African American, 0.3% Native American, 0.2% Asian, 0.2% from other races, and 1.6% from two or more races. Hispanic or Latino of any race were 1.2% of the population.

There were 3,398 households, of which 27.9% had children under the age of 18 living with them, 42.1% were married couples living together, 13.8% had a female householder with no husband present, 5.4% had a male householder with no wife present, and 38.6% were non-families. 34.8% of all households were made up of individuals, and 16.4% had someone living alone who was 65 years of age or older. The average household size was 2.22 and the average family size was 2.84.

The median age in the city was 43.3 years. 21.2% of residents were under the age of 18; 7.3% were between the ages of 18 and 24; 23.8% were from 25 to 44; 28.7% were from 45 to 64; and 19% were 65 years of age or older. The gender makeup of the city was 46.8% male and 53.2% female.

2000 census
As of the census of 2000, there were 7,589 people, 3,297 households, and 2,123 families living in the city. The population density was 1,570.9 people per square mile (606.7/km2). There were 3,619 housing units at an average density of 749.1 per square mile (289.3/km2). The racial makeup of the city was 93.02% White, 4.80% African American, 0.32% Native American, 0.42% Asian, 0.03% Pacific Islander, 0.24% from other races, and 1.19% from two or more races. Hispanic or Latino of any race were 0.84% of the population.

There were 3,297 households, out of which 27.0% had children under the age of 18 living with them, 47.1% were married couples living together, 13.8% had a female householder with no husband present, and 35.6% were non-families. 31.7% of all households were made up of individuals, and 16.2% had someone living alone who was 65 years of age or older. The average household size was 2.25 and the average family size was 2.80.

The age distribution was 20.5% under the age of 18, 8.5% from 18 to 24, 26.0% from 25 to 44, 24.7% from 45 to 64, and 20.4% who were 65 years of age or older. The median age was 42 years. For every 100 females, there were 87.9 males. For every 100 females age 18 and over, there were 81.8 males.

The median income for a household in the city was $24,792, and the median income for a family was $33,183. Males had a median income of $27,595 versus $18,760 for females. The per capita income for the city was $14,347. About 14.8% of families and 17.7% of the population were below the poverty line, including 27.9% of those under age 18 and 11.9% of those age 65 or over.

Employment
Oak Hill is located in West Virginia's southern coalfields and, as such, coal mining has played a primary role in the area's employment. Oak Hill also has a light manufacturing base.

Government
Oak Hill uses a city council consisting of eight members including the mayor. The city also employs a city manager to assist in organizing its day-to-day operations. As of March 2020, the current mayor of Oak Hill is Daniel E. Wright and the current city manager is William Hannabass.

Education
Public Schools:
New River Intermediate School,
New River primary School, 
Oak Hill Middle School,
Oak Hill High School,
Fayette Institute of Technology

Private Schools:
St. Peter & Paul Catholic School
Mountain View Christian School

Notable people
 Randy Gilkey, American singer, songwriter, multi-instrumentalist, producer and recording engineer (born in Oak Hill)

References

 
Cities in West Virginia
Cities in Fayette County, West Virginia
Micropolitan areas of West Virginia
Populated places established in 1820
1820 establishments in Virginia